Mona Lisa is a crater on Venus at latitude 25.6, longitude 25.1. It is 79.4 km in diameter and was named after Lisa Giacondo, Leonardo da Vinci's model for the painting Mona Lisa.

Impact craters on Venus